Jean-Louis Roux,  (May 18, 1923 – November 28, 2013) was a Canadian politician, entertainer and playwright who was briefly the 26th Lieutenant Governor of Quebec.

Biography
Born in Montreal, Quebec, he originally studied medicine at the Université de Montréal, but gave it up to pursue acting.  After travelling and performing in New York City and Paris he returned to Montreal and helped create the Théâtre du Nouveau Monde and became a frequent actor in and director of its productions for the next several years. He also turned to writing and wrote successful plays, radio dramas, and television shows.

His greatest fame comes from his role on La famille Plouffe, a very successful Quebec situation comedy.  Roux served as President of the Canadian Conference of the Arts from 1968 through 1970. In 1994 he was appointed to the Senate and remained there until resigning in 1996.  A fierce federalist, great controversy arose when he compared Quebec separatists to Nazis.

Upon leaving the Senate he was, at age 73, the oldest person ever appointed Lieutenant-Governor of Quebec on August 8, 1996.  Controversy reemerged when pictures were found showing Roux wearing a swastika on his lab coat in protest of the proposal to invoke conscription for service in World War II, and evidence emerged that he had participated in a 1942 protest against conscription in which some protesters, but not Roux, smashed the windows of some Jewish-owned businesses. As a medical student, Roux was exempted from wartime conscription provided he did part-time training  in the Canadian Army, which he did while pursuing his studies. 
It was later maintained that he had no known ties to fascist or anti-Semitic groups, and had in fact been a quite outspoken opponent of Nazism and anti-Semitism throughout his career, sometimes even refusing to accept roles in productions which he considered to include anti-Jewish stereotypes.

The controversy was widely viewed as an attempt to discredit an outspoken opponent of the Quebec sovereignty movement, as well as to whitewash emerging revelations that some figures in the Quebec sovereignty movement had also expressed fascist and anti-Semitic views in the past.

He later issued an apology for the swastika incident, which he described as "a medical student's mischievous desire to show off and be provocative, and in no way corresponded to any political conviction or ideology on my part," and announced his resignation as lieutenant governor on November 5, 1996. He retained the office, to give Prime Minister Jean Chrétien time to find and appoint a replacement, until Lise Thibault officially succeeded him on January 30, 1997.

On May 31, 1997 Roux returned to public life when the federal government appointed him to be chair of the Canada Council.

In 1971 he was made an Officer of the Order of Canada and was promoted to Companion in 1987. In 1989, he was made a Knight of the National Order of Quebec. Roux received a Governor General's Performing Arts Award for his lifetime contributions to Canadian theatre in 2004.

He died in Montreal on November 28, 2013.

Filmography
La famille Plouffe (1953)
Adventures in Rainbow Country (1969)
The Pyx (1973)
Duplessis (1978)
Two Solitudes (1978)
Riel (1979)
Chocolate Eclair (Éclair au chocolat) (1979)
Cordélia (1980)
The Hotel New Hampshire (1984)
The Revolving Doors (Les portes tournantes) (1988)
Salut Victor (1989)
My Friend Max (Mon amie Max) (1994)
Black List (Liste noire) (1995)
The Third Miracle (1999)
The Courage to Love (2000)
Battle of the Brave (Nouvelle-France) (2004)
C.R.A.Z.Y. (2005)

Coat of arms

See also
 List of Lieutenant Governors of Quebec
 Timeline of Quebec history

References

External links

An Interview with Jean Louis Roux, Legend Library, TheatreMuseumCanada

1923 births
2013 deaths
Canadian senators from Quebec
Canadian Army personnel of World War II
Canadian male stage actors
Companions of the Order of Canada
Knights of the National Order of Quebec
Lieutenant Governors of Quebec
Liberal Party of Canada senators
Male actors from Montreal
Politicians from Montreal
Prix Denise-Pelletier winners
Governor General's Performing Arts Award winners
Canadian male television actors
Canadian male film actors